A Krasnikov tube is a speculative mechanism for space travel involving the warping of spacetime into permanent superluminal tunnels. The resulting structure is analogous to a wormhole or an immobile Alcubierre drive (and like them requires exotic matter with negative energy density) with the endpoints displaced in time as well as space. The idea was proposed by Sergey Krasnikov in 1995.

Structure

The tube is a distortion of spacetime that can be intentionally created (using hypothetical technology) in the wake of travel near the speed of light. The Krasnikov tube allows for a return trip that takes travelers back to the time right after they left. Experiencing the effect requires that the traveler race along the tube at speeds close to that of light.

Causality violations

One-tube case

Krasnikov argues that despite the time-machine-like aspects of his metric, it cannot violate the law of causality (that a cause must always precede its effects in all coordinate systems and along all space-time paths) because all points along the round-trip path of the spaceship always have an ordered timelike separation interval (in algebraic terms,  is always larger than ). This means, for example, that a light-beam message sent along a Krasnikov tube cannot be used for back-in-time signaling.

Two-tube case

While one Krasnikov tube can be seen to present no problems with causality, it was proposed by Allen E. Everett and Thomas A. Roman of Tufts University that two Krasnikov tubes going in opposite directions can create a closed timelike curve, which would violate causality.

For example, suppose that a tube is built connecting Earth to a star 3000 light years away. The astronauts are travelling at relativistic velocities, so that the journey through this Tube I only takes 1.5 years from their perspective. Then the astronauts lay down tube II rather than travelling back in tube I, the first tube they produced. In another 1.5 years of ship time they will arrive back on Earth, but at a time 6000 years in the future of their departure. But now that two Krasnikov tubes are in place, astronauts from the future can travel to the star in tube II, then to Earth in tube I and will arrive 6000 years earlier than their departure. The Krasnikov tube system has become a time machine.

In 1993, Matt Visser argued that the two mouths of a wormhole with an induced clock difference could not be brought together without causing quantum field and gravitational effects that would either make the wormhole collapse or the two mouths repel each other. (See Time travel using wormholes and the Chronology protection conjecture.) It has been suggested that a similar mechanism would destroy time-machine Krasnikov tubes. That is,  vacuum fluctuation would grow exponentially, eventually destroying the second Krasnikov tube as it approaches the timelike loop limit, in which causality is violated.

See also
 Wormhole
 Time travel
 Wheeler–Feynman absorber theory

References

External links
 The Krasnikov Tube: A Subway to the Stars by John G. Cramer
 Exposition and criticism of the Krasnikov Tube by Allen E. Everett and Thomas A. Roman 
 Superluminal motion in (semi)classical relativity by Serguei Krasnikov (In Russian) 

Warp drive theory